Roundshaw is a housing estate and park in south Wallington and Beddington on the eastern edge of the London Borough of Sutton. Grid Ref .

History

Roundshaw was built on the site of the former Croydon Airport which once occupied the buildings of the first Croydon Aerodrome (originally named 'Plough Lane') which was demolished in 1928. The estate is commemorated in various ways; the naming of roads after aircraft, personalities, and firms linked with aviation to recall the airport's history: Mollison Drive, Lindbergh Road, Olley Close, Avro Way, Brabazon Avenue among other related aviation names. The name of the estate comes from Roundshaw Park on the edge of the site, named from a round 'shaw' or grove of trees.

The estate accommodates approximately 1,800 homes. Construction began in 1965 with the first tenants moving in August 1967. The original brutalist pre-cast concrete flats and maisonettes were heated from a central communal boiler house. This was demolished during the regeneration of the estate and the newly refurbished homes incorporate their own energy-efficient modern heating systems.

The London Borough of Sutton were the sole proprietors of the Roundshaw housing stock until 2007, when the responsibility was outsourced to Metropolitan and Hyde Housing Group who jointly created Roundshaw Homes. In 2015 the estate was transferred solely to Metropolitan.

Regeneration
During the mid 1980s and throughout the 1990s, major repairs and renovations of the concrete system dwellings were carried out by contracted specialists commissioned by the London Borough of Sutton, as the 1960s construction and build deteriorated which resulted in the cause of concrete cancer. The layout of the estate included underground garages and balcony passageways in which anti-social behaviour was commonplace.

Due to the large spiraling costs generated by the ongoing repairs, the London Borough of Sutton began to formulate plans for a regeneration programme. After various consultations with the Roundshaw Residents Group, building contractors and various social housing groups, the problems were addressed of the original estate. Refurbishment trials began at Barnard Close and Shaw Way which were the only original 1960's concrete system blocks to be refurbished. This was carried out as a pilot scheme in the late 1980s and mid 1990s but this was not repeated throughout the rest of the estate, as it was not cost effective. Barnard Close is the only refurbished concrete system block still existing today. Shaw Way was subsequently demolished later at the final phase of the regeneration.

In 1998, the decision was taken to start the process  of a partial demolition regeneration programme over a ten-year period, resulting at a cost of £80m. 1,000 high-rise and street level concrete system flats and maisonnettes were demolished. Phase one of that programme began at Roe Way, street level maisonettes were  demolished manually and Instone Close, a high-rise block, was imploded, both in November 2000. This followed a phase by phase roll-out of the rest of the estate being replaced with a number of new build low-rise houses and brick-built flats.

A further 674 brick built homes which were also part of the original estate and not of the concrete system, were retained and refurbished with pitched roofs. The regeneration programme was completed in 2010.

Local amenities

St Paul's Church was constructed and opened in 1981, which is used by the Church of England and the Free Churches. St Paul's was rebuilt and extended during the regeneration.  Originally, it collaborated in a churchless religious venture known as the 'Roundshaw Experiment'. A cross was set up outside the church which is made from a four-bladed propeller, or airscrew, obtained through the Croydon Airport Society.

The primary school was named after the famous aviator, Amy Johnson, the first woman to fly solo to Australia, from Croydon Airport in May 1930.

Wilson's School was moved from Camberwell to Roundshaw in 1975.

Roundshaw Fields hosts the Croydon Pirates baseball team, one of the most successful teams in the British Baseball Federation. The fields have two of the best baseball diamonds in the U.K. which Croydon often hosts the London Tournament and National Finals.

There are a number of shops and takeaways in Mollison Square.

The Phoenix Centre is the hub of the local community; in addition to the sporting and recreation activities, the centre has a library and IT Centre, Local Access Point, Youth Centre, Sensory Room and the Beehive Cafe. Charities such as Mencap run sporting sessions and community groups have access to the facilities.

The Phoenix Centre provides the following resources and activities:
Freedom Fitness Centre
Group Exercise Studio
Full Sized Sports Hall
Women's Morning
Saturday Morning Family Fun Sessions
Sutton Evergreens 50+ Sport Activities and Exercise Classes

Bus routes:
154
455
S4

Popular culture

Paralympic athlete David Weir lives in the area. The postbox in Mollison Square was painted gold in honour of the multiple medal winning performances at the 2012 Paralympics.
Roundshaw was used as a filming location for the ITV drama The Bill, made by Thames Television.
The main estate road, Mollison Drive, is named after the Scottish aviator Jim Mollison.
The London Programme, made by London Weekend Television, filmed a feature on the estate in 1976.
Said to have been a key place of development of the Acid House musical movement in the late 1980s.

See also
List of Parks and Open Spaces in Croydon

References

External links
Hidden London

Areas of London
Districts of the London Borough of Sutton
Districts of the London Borough of Croydon
Parks and open spaces in the London Borough of Croydon
Housing estates in the London Borough of Sutton